Whykong Union is a union, the smallest administrative body of Bangladesh, located in Teknaf Upazila, Cox's Bazar District, Bangladesh. The total population is 34,537. The union borders Myanmar and has seen an influx of Rohingya refugees.

References

Unions of Teknaf Upazila